Lee Herbert Hamilton (born April 20, 1931) is an American politician and lawyer from Indiana. He is a former member of the United States House of Representatives and a former member of the U.S. Homeland Security Advisory Council. A member of the Democratic Party, Hamilton represented the 9th congressional district of Indiana from 1965 to 1999. Following his departure from Congress, he has served on a number of governmental advisory boards, most notably as the vice chairman of the 9/11 Commission.

Early life and education
Born in Daytona Beach, Florida, Hamilton was raised in Evansville, Indiana, attending the public schools and graduating from Evansville Central High School in 1948.  An outstanding basketball player, he led the Central Bears to the state title game in March 1948; he then continued his playing career at DePauw University, where he played for Coach Jay McCreary before graduating in 1952 and then from the Indiana Univ. School of Law in 1956. He worked as a lawyer in private practice for the next ten years in Columbus, Indiana.

Congress

Hamilton was elected to the House of Representatives as a Democrat as part of the national Democratic landslide of 1964. He chaired many committees during his tenure in office, including the House Committee on Foreign Affairs, the U.S. House Permanent Select Committee on Intelligence, the Joint Committee on Printing, and others.

As chairman of the House Select Committee to Investigate Covert Arms Transactions with Iran (1987), Hamilton chose not to investigate President Ronald Reagan or President George H. W. Bush, stating that he did not think it would be "good for the country" to put the public through another impeachment trial. Hamilton was later chair of the House October Surprise Task Force (1992).

He remained in Congress until 1999; at the time he was one of two surviving members of the large Democratic freshman class of 1965 (the other being John Conyers). He was viewed as a potential Democratic vice-presidential running mate in 1984, 1988, and 1992, due to his foreign policy credentials and Indiana's potential to turn into what would later be described as a "blue" state due to economic concerns.

Life after Congress
In November 2002, George W. Bush nominated Hamilton as the Vice-Chairman of the 9/11 Commission, officially titled The National Commission on Terrorist Attacks on the United States. On March 15, 2006, Congress announced the formation of the Iraq Study Group, organized by the United States Institute of Peace, of which Hamilton was the Democratic co-chairman, along with the former Secretary of State (under President George H.W. Bush) James A. Baker III. Hamilton, like Baker, was considered a master negotiator.

Since leaving Congress, Mr. Hamilton has served as a member of the Hart-Rudman Commission, and was co-chairman of the Commission to Investigate Certain Security Issues at Los Alamos. He sits on many advisory boards, including those to the CIA, the President's Homeland Security Advisory Council, and the United States Army. Hamilton is an Advisory Board member and Co-Chair for the Partnership for a Secure America, a not-for-profit organization dedicated to recreating the bipartisan center in American national security and foreign policy. He is previously the president and director of the Woodrow Wilson International Center for Scholars, and was appointed to serve as the vice chair of the 9/11 Commission. In 2000–2001, he served as the American member of the International Commission on Intervention and State Sovereignty, which prepared the U.N policy of Responsibility to Protect, adopted in 2005. He is also a member of the Board of Advisors of Albright Stonebridge Group. He was appointed Co-Chair of the Blue Ribbon Commission on America's Nuclear Future from 2010–2012 alongside Brent Scowcroft. He is also a member of Washington D.C. based think tank, the Inter-American Dialogue.

Hamilton serves as a co-chair of the National Security Preparedness Group (NSPG) at the Bipartisan Policy Center. Hamilton is a co-chair with Sandra Day O'Connor of the Campaign for the Civic Mission of Schools. He also serves as an Advisory Board member for the Partnership for a Secure America and for America Abroad Media.

On February 25, 2011, Hamilton wrote a letter to President Barack Obama urging him to commute Jonathan Pollard's sentence to time served. Pollard was serving a life sentence for providing Israel with classified information, without the intent to harm the United States, a crime which normally carries a sentence of two to four years. In his letter, he stated, "I do believe that he has served a disproportionately severe sentence." He also stated, "I have been acquainted for many years with members of his family, especially his parents, and I know how much pain and anguish they have suffered because of their son's incarceration." He concluded that, "commuting his sentence is a matter of basic compassion and justice. Pollard was granted parole on July 7, 2015, and released on November 20, 2015.

On August 11, 2012, Hamilton's wife Nancy died in an auto-related accident; no one else was injured. Prior to her death, Mrs. Hamilton was an accomplished artist. In 1981 her oil paintings and watercolors were featured in an exhibit at The Commons and in 1984 she had a one-woman show at a Seymour art gallery. Mrs. Hamilton also contributed thousands of hours at the INOVA Alexandria Virginia Hospital.

Hamilton endorsed Barack Obama in the 2008 presidential election.

Hamilton is a member of the ReFormers Caucus of Issue One.

World Justice Project
Lee H. Hamilton serves as an Honorary Co-Chair for the World Justice Project. The World Justice Project works to lead a global, multidisciplinary effort to strengthen the Rule of Law for the development of communities of opportunity and equity.

Honors and awards
A nine-mile stretch of I-265 and Indiana 265 in Floyd and Clark counties, part of Hamilton's former House district, was designated the "Lee H. Hamilton Highway" shortly after his retirement from the House in 1999. The moniker is largely symbolic, as locals generally do not refer to the road by that name, although the name is used frequently by the traffic reporter for the area's largest radio station, WHAS 840-AM in nearby Louisville, Kentucky.

In 1982, Hamilton was inducted into the Indiana Basketball Hall of Fame, in honor of his outstanding prep basketball career; he led the Evansville Central Bears to three deep runs in the IHSAA tournament.  In 1946, the Bears made the State Semi-finals, in 1947, they made the State Quarter-finals; as a Senior, he led them to the Championship game.  He was selected All-State his senior season and was awarded the Trestor Award for mental attitude.  He later starred for the DePauw Tigers, leading them in scoring average in 1951 and rebounds in 1951 and 1952.

In 2001 Lee H. Hamilton was presented the Lifetime Contributions to American Diplomacy Award by the American Foreign Service Association.

In 2005, Hamilton received the U.S. Senator John Heinz Award for Greatest Public Service by an Elected or Appointed Official, an award given out annually by Jefferson Awards.

In 2007, Hamilton was elected as an honorary fellow in the National Academy of Public Administration.

In 2011, Hamilton received the Benjamin Harrison Presidential Site Advancing American Democracy Award.

In November 2015, Hamilton was awarded the Presidential Medal of Freedom by President Barack Obama in a ceremony at the White House.

In 2018, Indiana University Bloomington announced that the School of Global and International Studies will be renamed the Hamilton Lugar School of Global and International Studies in honor of Hamilton and former U.S. Senator Richard Lugar, describing both as "two immensely accomplished Indiana statesmen and two of the nation's most distinguished and influential voices in foreign policy."

Bibliography
 A Creative Tension: The Foreign Policy Roles of the President and the Congress, with Jordan Tama, Washington, D.C.: Woodrow Wilson Center Press, 2003.
How Congress Works and Why You Should Care. Bloomington, IN: Indiana University Press, 2004.
Without Precedent, the Inside Story of the 9/11 Commission, with T. H. Kean, New York: Vintage Books, Random House, Inc., 2007.
Strengthening Congress. Bloomington, IN: Indiana University Press, 2009.
The 9/11 Commission Report: Final Report of the National Commission on Terrorist Attacks Upon the United States. New York: W. W. Norton & Company, 2011.

References

External links
Foreign Service Journal article on his Lifetime Contributions to American Diplomacy Award. 

 Woodrow Wilson International Center for Scholars wilsoncenter.org
 Lee Hamilton Biography and Resources wilsoncenter.org
 Iraq Study Group  usip.org
 Voting record maintained by the Washington Post washingtonpost.com
 Stonewalled by the C.I.A. Op-Ed piece co-authored with Thomas Kean in the edition of January 2, 2008 of the New York Times (accessed January 2, 2008)
 Hamilton, Lee H. How Congress Works and Why You Should Care. Bloomington: Indiana University Press, 2004.
 Hamilton, Lee H. Strengthening Congress. Bloomington: Indiana University Press, 2009.
 
 C-SPAN Q&A interview with Hamilton, January 8, 2006
 A Legacy of Honor:The Congressional Papers of Lee H. Hamilton. Lilly Library, Bloomington, IN

|-

|-

1931 births
Living people
DePauw Tigers men's basketball players
People from Columbus, Indiana
People from Daytona Beach, Florida
Indiana University Maurer School of Law alumni
Indiana lawyers
Democratic Party members of the United States House of Representatives from Indiana
Presidential Medal of Freedom recipients
National Bureau of Asian Research
American men's basketball players
Recipients of the Four Freedoms Award
Members of the Inter-American Dialogue